Stephen E. Weiss is an associate professor of policy and international business at the Schulich School of Business, York University (from 2012 to 2015, he was the academic director for their MBA program) and a consultant and coach at Weiss Negotiations.

Education
 International relations and conflict analysis,  Ph.D., University of Pennsylvania.

Personal life
In 1989, he married Ellen Auster, when he was a professor at the New York University Stern School of Business.

References

Year of birth missing (living people)
Living people
Academic staff of York University
University of Pennsylvania alumni
New York University Stern School of Business faculty